Father Radetzky (German: Vater Radetzky) is a 1929 Austrian war film directed by Karl Leiter and starring Karl Forest, Otto Hartmann and Theodor Pištěk. It is a biopic of the nineteenth century Austrian soldier Joseph Radetzky von Radetz. It was made by Sascha-Film in Vienna and was released on 13 September 1929. The film's sets were designed by the art director Emil Stepanek.

Cast
 Karl Forest as Feldmarschall Radetzky
 Otto Hartmann as Lorenz Hauser
 Theodor Pištěk as Leonhard Planinger
 Iris Arlan as Annerl, seine Tochter
 Ágnes Esterházy as Itala Fassotti
 Joseph Sneyden as Mario Gallone
 Vilma Astay as Metternich
 Grete Natzler 
 Annie Rosar

References

Bibliography
 Holmes, Deborah & Silverman, Lisa. Interwar Vienna: culture between tradition and modernity. Camden House, 2009.

External links

1929 films
Austrian silent feature films
Austrian biographical films
Austrian war films
Austrian historical films
1929 war films
1920s historical films
Films set in the 19th century
1920s biographical films
Films set in the Austrian Empire
Silent war films
1920s German-language films